James Zotiah (born April 7, 1988) is a Liberian footballer who plays as a midfielder for Black Star. He is also a member of the Liberia national football team. He made his international debut in 2007 against Rwanda.

External links 
James Zotiah - http://liberiansoccer.darkbb.com

Zotiah negotiates with Bochum

Living people
1988 births
Liberian footballers
Liberia international footballers
Liberian expatriate footballers
Association football midfielders
Liberian expatriate sportspeople in Spain
Expatriate footballers in Spain
Sportspeople from Monrovia